Saalburg is a surname. Notable people with the name include:

Allen Saalburg (1899–1987), American painter, illustrator, and screen printer
Charles W. Saalburg (1865–1947), American cartoonist and illustrator

See also
Salberg
Saltzberg
Salzburg (disambiguation)